Horst Stemke (born March 4, 1942) is a retired U.S. soccer defender who was a member of the U.S. soccer team at the 1972 Summer Olympics.

Youth
Born in Lubin, Germany, Stemke grew up in Green Bay, Wisconsin.  He attended the University of Wisconsin–Green Bay, playing on the men’s soccer team from 1970 to 1973.  He was a 1972 honorable mention (third team) All American and was inducted into the University of Wisconsin Green Bay Hall of Fame in 1993.

Olympics
In 1967, he joined the U.S. Olympic Soccer Team for its ultimately unsuccessful qualification campaign for the 1968 Summer Olympics.   He was called into the Olympic team for the 1972 Summer Olympics.  This time around, he and his team mates made the Olympic tournament.  He played all three  games as the U.S. went 0-2-1.  He ended his Olympic team career having played 16 total games with the team.

Coach
Stemke has spent several decades coaching in the Green Bay area.  He was a founding member of the Green Bay Lightning Youth Soccer Club and coached at Preble High School.   He was inducted into the Wisconsin Adult Soccer Association (WASA) Hall of Fame in 1989.

His son, Kevin Stemke was an NFL punter for several years.

References

1942 births
People from Lubin 
Sportspeople from Lower Silesian Voivodeship
German emigrants to the United States
American soccer coaches
American soccer players
Soccer players from Wisconsin
Sportspeople from Green Bay, Wisconsin
University of Wisconsin–Green Bay alumni
Michigan State Spartans men's soccer players
Olympic soccer players of the United States
Footballers at the 1972 Summer Olympics
Living people
Association football defenders